Zhu Yanmei (born 16 October 1986 in Yuyang District, Shaanxi) is a female Chinese athletics long-distance runner. She represented her native country at the 3,000 m steeplechase event at the 2008 Summer Olympics. She also ran at the 2007 World Championships in Athletics.

Personal best
2008 China Open - 1st 3000m steeplechase

References
http://2008teamchina.olympic.cn/index.php/personview/personsen/1968

1986 births
Living people
Athletes (track and field) at the 2008 Summer Olympics
Chinese female long-distance runners
Olympic athletes of China
Runners from Shaanxi
Chinese female steeplechase runners
People from Yulin, Shaanxi